The Arctic Red River is a tributary to the Mackenzie River in the Northwest Territories, Canada.
In 1993 the river was designated as part of the Canadian Heritage Rivers System. It was also the name of a community on the Mackenzie where the river joins, now known as Tsiigehtchic. The Dempster Highway crosses the Mackenzie at this point.

The river flows through a deep canyon as it flows through the Peel Plateau. The Gwich'in name for the river, Tsiigèhnjik, translates as iron river. The lower  of the river are navigable by kayakers and canoers, without requiring portaging.

See also
List of rivers of the Northwest Territories

References

External links 
 Map from the Canadian Heritage Rivers site.

Rivers of the Northwest Territories
Canadian Heritage Rivers
Canyons and gorges of Canada
Tributaries of the Mackenzie River